Shpic (Macedonian Cyrillic: "Шпиц") translated: "Pinnacle", was a daily newspaper in North Macedonia. The newspaper was free until 2010, after which date it cost 15 MKD.

References

Newspapers published in North Macedonia
Macedonian-language newspapers
Publications established in 2006